ABCnews.com.co was a fake news website which mimicked the URL, design and logo of the ABC News website. Many stories from ABCnews.com.co were widely shared before being debunked.

The website's disclaimer page gave the address of the Westboro Baptist Church as its primary location.

Paul Horner, the owner of the site, claimed to make $10,000 per month from advertising traffic.

Examples of fake news stories
ABCnews.com.co promulgated stories about prominent figures and organizations, including:
Anti-Trump protesters hired from Craigslist paid as much as $3,500
El Chapo escaped from Mexican prison again
President Barack Obama signed an order banning assault weapon sales
Michael Jordan intended to move the Charlotte Hornets out of North Carolina if the state did not revoke a law disallowing transgender people access to restrooms
The Supreme Court of the United States revoked the tax-exempt status of the Church of Scientology

See also
List of fake news websites

References

External links
Official site

Fake news websites